Bortolo Nardini is an Italian family-owned producer of alcoholic drinks, notably grappa. Founded in 1779 and based in Bassano del Grappa, the company produces four million bottles of grappa per year - over a quarter of the world market - making it the brand leader in this area.

Products
Nardini Bianca is Italy's best-selling grappa with an ABV of 50%.

As well as grappa, the company also produces other digestifs such as amaro, and also apéritifs.

References

External links
 Company Homepage

Distilleries in Italy
1779 establishments in Italy
Companies based in Veneto
Italian companies established in 1779
Food and drink companies established in 1779
Italian brands